Elyas Afewerki (born 27 December 1992) is an Eritrean cyclist, who last rode for Swedish amateur team CK Hymer.

Major results

2012
 9th Overall Tour of Eritrea
2013
 4th Overall Fenkel Northern Redsea
 4th Circuit of Asmara
2014
 5th Road race, National Road Championships
 7th Overall Tour de Blida
 8th Critérium International de Blida
 9th Overall Tour International de Sétif
2015
 10th Overall La Tropicale Amissa Bongo
2016
 African Road Championships
1st  Team time trial
6th Road race
 1st Stage 4 Tour of Eritrea
 5th Circuit International d'Alger
 6th Overall Tour d'Annaba
 6th Overall Tour de Tunisie
 6th Asmara Circuit
 8th Overall Tour Internationale d'Oranie
 8th Massawa Circuit
 10th Overall La Tropicale Amissa Bongo
 10th Overall Tour International de Sétif
 10th Fenkil Northern Red Sea Challenge
 10th Critérium International de Sétif
2017
 2nd Road race, National Road Championships

References

External links

1992 births
Living people
Eritrean male cyclists